"My Weapon" is a song performed by American contemporary Christian music singer and songwriter Natalie Grant. "My Weapon" is the lead single from her tenth studio album No Stranger.

Background
“Whatever current difficulty or hardship we find ourselves in, there is one thing that is a source of comfort and strength above all else, and it is also our greatest weapon—the presence of God. And His presence is always with us,” Grant explains of the message behind her song. “Joshua 1:9 reminds us to ‘not be afraid; do not be discouraged, for the Lord your God will be with you wherever you go.’ So no matter the fight, we never fight alone. May this song remind you that God is with you and God is for you, fighting your battles. He is your victory.”

Composition
"My Weapon" is originally in the key of Ab Major, with a tempo of 78 beats per minute.

Critical reception

NewRelease Today shared, “Every so often, a powerful lyric comes through and provides peace and calm in the midst of a world that’s spinning out of control. From the first notes of Natalie Grant’s newest single, ‘My Weapon,’ that peace is found, clearing the way for God to speak and for the listener to find comfort and safety in His arms.”

Year-end lists

Commercial performance
The song peaked at  No. 4 on the Billboard Christian Digital Songs, on March 7, 2020. Becoming her second highest charting song on the chart, behind King of the World, which peaked at  No. 3 on November 26, 2016.

Music video
A sacred version of the song was recorded live at AIR Lyndhurst Hall in London, UK with the London Studio Orchestra. It was released on February 22, 2020. The music video has surpassed over a million views on YouTube.

Credits and personnel
Credits adapted from Genius
Natalie Grant – vocals, songwriter
Andrew Bergthold – songwriter
Benji Cowart – songwriter
Ryan Ellis – songwriter
Jonathan Jay – songwriter
Bernie Herms – producer

Live performances
Natalie did an acoustic version of "My Weapon" during a @CCLI Pop-Up session. The single was also performed in Grant's house with Bernie Herms playing the piano, while Grant sings. It was uploaded on her YouTube channel.

Track listing
Digital download
"My Weapon" — 4:21
"My Weapon (Sacred Version)" — 5:13

Charts

Weekly charts

Year-end charts

Release history

References

2020 singles
2020 songs
Gospel songs
American pop songs
Contemporary Christian songs
Curb Records singles
Natalie Grant songs